This is a list of gold mining disasters including environmental, such as those arising due to dam failure, cyanide leakage into the environment, as well as inappropriate environmental toxic waste discharge due to the gold cyanidation technique used in gold mining.  Other disasters at gold mines such as those resulting in loss of life are also listed.

References

External links
 Summit declaration, Peoples' Gold Summit, San Juan Ridge, California; June 1999.
  Air pollution caused by mercury and lead emissions from the artisanal gold mining; Blacksmith Institute Report; 2012

 
Gold
Gold mining disasters
Gold mining